Independent Nationalist is a political title frequently used by Irish nationalists when contesting elections to the House of Commons of the United Kingdom Great Britain and Ireland not as members of the Irish Parliamentary Party, in the late nineteenth and early twentieth centuries.

In the main, but certainly not always, such Independent Nationalist candidates were either the Healyite Nationalists, supporters of Timothy Michael Healy, or the O'Brienite Nationalists, supporters of William O'Brien.

Some others were elected as Independent Nationalists outside of the above groupings, such as Timothy Harrington (1900 and 1906), Joseph Nolan (1900), D. D. Sheehan (1906), and Laurence Ginnell (in both the January and December 1910 elections).

William Redmond and James Cosgrave were elected to Dáil Éireann as Independent Nationalists in 1923, before going on to form the National League Party.

Later in the twentieth century, Michael O'Neill was elected to the House of Commons as an Independent Nationalist in 1951. John Hume, Paddy O'Hanlon, and Ivan Cooper were elected to the Northern Ireland House of Commons as Independent Nationalists in 1969; they formed the Social Democratic and Labour Party in the following year.

 
Defunct political parties in the United Kingdom
Political parties in pre-partition Ireland